Shen Jie may refer to:

Shen Jie (canoeist) (born 1986), Chinese flatwater canoer 
Shen Jie (Fengshen Yanyi), character in Chinese novel Fengshen Yanyi